Pseudodrephalys hypargus is a butterfly belonging to the family Hesperiidae. These butterflies are commonly found in Venezuela (Amazonas), Guyana, French Guiana, Brazil (Amazonas, Pará, Mato Grosso, Rondônia), Peru (Madre de Dios).

References
http://www.ftp.funet.fi/index/Tree_of_life/insecta/lepidoptera/ditrysia/hesperioidea/hesperiidae/pyrginae/pseudodrephalys/index.html#atinas

Pyrgini
Taxa named by Paul Mabille

fr:Pyrginae